Koliba is the name of a locality in Bratislava, Slovakia, which is situated on the foothills of the Little Carpathians. It administratively belongs to the Nové Mesto borough and is part of the Bratislava Forest Park.

The Kamzík TV Tower and the Kamzík Hill (439 m) are located at the edge of the locality. It is also home to the Koliba Film Studios (Slovak: Filmové ateliéry Koliba).

External links
 Koliba locality on a map of Bratislava

Boroughs of Bratislava